Sinton may refer to:

Sinton (surname)
Sinton, Texas, a town named after David Sinton
Sinton (crater), an impact crater on Mars